Vevring is a former municipality in the old Sogn og Fjordane county, Norway. The municipality existed from 1838 until its dissolution in 1964. It encompassed the land surrounding the western part of the Førdefjorden on both the north and south shores of the fjord in what is now Kinn, Askvoll, and Sunnfjord municipalities in Vestland county. It stretched from the Ålasundet strait (the narrowest part of the fjord) in the east to the mouth of the fjord in the west and from the Steindalen valley in the north to the mountains south of the fjord.

The administrative centre of the municipality was the village of Indrevevring (on the north shore of the fjord), where the Vevring Church is located.  The village of Kvammen, across the fjord from Indrevevring was the main village on the south side of the fjord.

Name
The municipality was named after the old Vevring farm, since Vevring Church is located there.  The farm was named after a stream that flowed past it.  The name of the stream comes from the Old Norse word vafra which means to "go here and there", which describes the path of the stream.

History
The parish of Vevring was established as a municipality on 1 January 1838 (see formannskapsdistrikt law). During the 1960s, there were many municipal mergers across Norway due to the work of the Schei Committee.  On 1 January 1964, the municipality was dissolved and split between three surrounding municipalities:
the Steindal valley (population: 25) in the north was incorporated into the newly created Flora Municipality
the area south of the Førdefjorden (population: 407) was incorporated into Askvoll Municipality 
the area north of the Førdefjorden (population: 439) was incorporated into Naustdal Municipality

Government

Municipal council
The municipal council  of Vevring was made up of representatives that were elected to four year terms.  The party breakdown of the final municipal council was as follows:

See also
List of former municipalities of Norway

References

External links

 Map of Vevring municipality from 1919 

Askvoll
Kinn
Sunnfjord
Former municipalities of Norway
1838 establishments in Norway
1964 disestablishments in Norway